The United States Air Force's 426th Network Warfare Squadron (426 NWS) is an Air Force Reserve unit previously located in Vogelweh, Germany.

Since March 8, 2014, the 426 NWS has been officially relocated to San Antonio, Texas at Lackland Air Force Base.

Lineage
 Constituted as 26th Airdrome Squadron on 25 Jan 1943.  Activated 1 Feb 1943.  
 Redesignated as 26th Airdrome Squadron (Special) on 16 Apr 1943.  
 Disbanded on 1 Apr 1944.   
 Reconstituted on 11 Sep 1946.  
 Activated on 15 Oct 1946.  
 Inactivated on 28 Jul 1948.  
 Disbanded on 8 Oct 1948.  
 Reconstituted, redesignated as 26th Operations Support Flight, and activated, on 1 Oct 1993.  
 Redesignated as 426th Intelligence Squadron on 31 Dec 1995.
 Redesignated as 426th Information Operations Squadron on 1 Aug 2000.
 Redesignated as 426th Network Warfare Squadron on 5 Jul 2008.  
 Inactivated on 7 Sep 2011.  
 Activated on 1 Mar 2013.

Assignments

Major Command
Air Force Intelligence Command (1 October 1991 – 1 October 1993)
Air Combat Command (2000–2009)
Air Force Space Command (2009–2018)
Air Force Reserve Command(2018–Present)

Wing/Group
24th Composite Wing (1946–1948)
688th Cyberspace Wing (2013-Present)
960th Cyber Operations Group (2013–Present)

Previous designations

26th Airdrome Squadron (25 January 1943 – 16 April 1943)
26th Airdrome Squadron (Special) (16 April 1943 – 1 April 1944; 11 September 1946 – 28 July 1948)
26th Operations Support Flight (1 October 1993 – 31 December 1995)
426th Intelligence Squadron (31 December 1995 – 1 August 2000)
426th Information Operations Squadron (1 August 2000 – 5 July 2008)
426th Network Warfare Squadron (5 July 2008–Present)

Bases stationed
Kearney Army Airfield, Nebraska (1 February 1943 – 1 April 1944)
Beane Field, St Lucia, British West Indies (15 October 1946 – 28 July 1948)
Vogelweh, Germany (1 October 1993 – 2014)
Lackland Air Force Base, Texas, United States of America (8 March 2014, 2014–Present)

Decorations
Air Force Outstanding Unit Award 
1 October 1993 – 30 September 1994
1 October 1994 – 30 September 1995
1 October 1999 – 30 September 2000
1 June 2001 – 31 May 2002
1 June 2002 – 31 May 2003 (with Combat "V" device)
1 June 2003 – 31 May 2005
1 June 2005 – 31 May 2007

See also
 List of cyber warfare forces

References

Network Warfare